Boris Lukášik (born 24 February 1935) is a Slovak basketball player. He competed in the men's tournament at the 1960 Summer Olympics.

References

1935 births
Living people
Slovak men's basketball players
Olympic basketball players of Czechoslovakia
Basketball players at the 1960 Summer Olympics
Sportspeople from Ružomberok